Masjid An-Nahdhah, (Jawi:مسجد النهضة; Malay for An-Nahdhah Mosque) is a mosque located in Bishan. The mosque was the sixth to be built under Phase III of the Mosque Building Fund program. It opened on January 6, 2006 and can accommodate about 4,000 worshippers. The building also contains the Harmony Centre @ An-Nahdhah visitor center.

As of January 2019, Friday prayers are available for female worshipers.

Design concept
An-Nahdhah Mosque is a new-generation mosque, serving religious needs of the local Muslim community and providing a platform for other social services. The mosque performs religious education; provides family, youth and social development; and serves as a center for information services and referrals.

The mosque is designed so that most areas, such as the basement and classrooms, can be used as extensions to the praying area.

Harmony Centre @ An-Nahdhah

Harmony Centre @ An-Nahdhah is a visitor center located within Masjid An-Nahdhah. It was officially opened on October 7th 2006 by Lee Hsien Loong, the prime minister of Singapore. The centre represents one of the initiatives of the Majlis Ugama Islam Singapura to bring about a greater understanding of Islam in Singapore. Since April 2013, the centre has been headed by Ustaz Muhammad Fazalee Ja'afar.

The Harmony Centre showcases exhibits, artifacts and information on Islamic civilisation and lifestyle. The centre also hosts talks and activities.

See also
Islam in Singapore
List of mosques in Singapore

References

External links

Muis
Portal for Mosques in Singapore

2006 establishments in Singapore
Buildings and structures in Bishan, Singapore
Mosques completed in 2006
Nahdhah